Whimpton Village is a deserted medieval village in Nottinghamshire, England. It is near the A57 road between the villages of Darlton and Dunham-on-Trent. It is a Scheduled Monument.

History
Whimpton is mentioned, as Wimentun, in the Domesday Book; it is described there as one of the four berewicks of the King's Manor of Duneham (Dunham). A berewick was a detached, partly independent portion of a manor. The village (spelled also Wimpton or Wymton) is mentioned in pipe rolls in the 12th, 13th and 14th centuries, mentioning land and inhabitants of the village. The village evidently did not exist by 1547, since in that year there was an inquisition post mortem on the properties of Robert Nevyll, in which Whimpton is only a field name.

Earthworks
The surviving remains of the village are earthworks mostly in a field, on rising ground, south of the A52 road; some are north of the road, near Whimpton House. There is a roadway, widest at the centre and narrower at either end, running from west to east across the field south of the modern road, following the ridge of the hill. To the south of this roadway is evidence of past cultivation.

Two roads lead north from the roadway, taking winding courses towards the A57 road.

On the site south of the modern road there are rectangular enclosures, marked by low banks and ditches, each with a raised rectangular platform; these are the remains of walls and foundations of medieval houses. It is thought this may be the village green in the centre of the village; there are no structural remains here, but there are two hollows, which may be ponds.

See also
 List of lost settlements in the United Kingdom

References

Deserted medieval villages in Nottinghamshire
Scheduled monuments in Nottinghamshire